Tribute of the Year: A Tribute to Faith No More is a compilation tribute of Faith No More covers, released in 2002. Thirty independent North American and European bands perform a song from all of Faith No More's studio albums in this 2-CD compilation only released in the North American market.

Track listing

Disc 1 
 "Stripsearch" covered by VooDou
 "Midlife Crisis" covered by Bile
 "We Care a Lot" covered by Parallax 1
 "Mouth To Mouth" covered by Tub Ring
 "The Gentle Art of Making Enemies" covered by Imbue
 "The World Is Yours" covered by The Donkey Punch
 "Everything's Ruined" covered by Daiquiri
 "Kindergarten" covered by Drowning Season
 "Malpractice" covered by The Rib
 "Absolute Zero" covered by Ichabod
 "Be Aggressive" covered by Sump Pumps
 "As The Worm Turns" covered by Yellow No. 5
 "Stripsearch" covered by Victims In Ecstasy
 "King For A Day" covered by Medulla Nocte
 "We Care a Lot" covered by Esper's Obession

Disc 2 
 "Jizzlobber" covered by Grim Faeries
 "Edge of the World" covered by Hate Dept.
 "A Small Victory" covered by Germ Theory
 "We Care a Lot" covered by Die:schon
 "Blood" covered by New Low
 "Naked In Front of the Computer" covered by Fountainhead (Detroit based band. Curry, Miller, Kaye, Connelly)
 "Stripsearch" covered by Basement Love Underground
 "Midlife Crisis" covered by Sickend
 "Another Body Murdered" covered by Sounds of Mass Production
 "Why Do You Bother" covered by New Grenada
 "Surprise! You're Dead!" covered by Humans Being
 "Spirit" covered by Window Pane
 "Digging the Grave" covered by Son Of Indra
 "The Real Thing" covered by Mukrak
 "Edge of the World" covered by Combine Heathen

External links 
Cduniverse.com, page on this album

Faith No More albums
2002 albums